The following is a list of International Baccalaureate World Schools in Singapore.

See also

 List of international schools

References

 
Singapore